Second Ward School may refer to:

Second Ward School (Santa Fe, New Mexico), listed on the National Register of Historic Places in Santa Fe County, New Mexico
Second Ward School (Eau Claire, Wisconsin), listed on the National Register of Historic Places in Eau Claire County, Wisconsin

See also
Ward School (disambiguation)